Beit Zayit is a moshav in Israel. Located just outside the Jerusalem municipal border to the west, it falls under the jurisdiction of Mateh Yehuda Regional Council.

Beit Zayit lies on the edge of the Jerusalem Forest and operates a public swimming pool. Nearby is the Ein Kerem dam, built to store winter flood waters.

History
A village named Beit Zayit is mentioned in the book of the Maccabees, but it is believed to have been further north, possibly at the site of the Palestinian Christian town of Bir Zeit, north of Ramallah. Beit Zayit was established on land that had belonged to the depopulated Palestinian village of 'Ayn Karim.

The village was established in 1949 by Jewish immigrants from Egypt, Romania and Yugoslavia. The economy was based on fruit orchards, vegetables, poultry, and other farm products.

With the expansion of the moshav in the late 1990s, including the purchase of land by newcomers and renovation of old homes, Beit Zayit became a trendy alternative to living in Jerusalem.

Dinosaur footprints
In 1962, dinosaur footprints were discovered in the garden of one of Beit Zayit's residents, and are on display at the Hebrew University of Jerusalem. This is the only place in Israel where evidence of dinosaurs was discovered, and one of few such sites in the Middle East.

References

External links
Village website 

Moshavim
Populated places established in 1949
Populated places in Jerusalem District
1949 establishments in Israel
Egyptian-Jewish culture in Israel
Hungarian-Jewish culture in Israel
Romanian-Jewish culture in Israel
Yugoslav-Jewish culture in Israel
Paleontology in Israel